Emarginula bicancellata is a species of sea snail, a marine gastropod mollusk in the family Fissurellidae, the keyhole limpets and slit limpets.

Distribution
This marine species occurs off New Caledonia.

References

 Montrouzier, X., 1860. Descriptions d'espèces nouvelles de l'Archipel Calédonien. Journal de Conchyliologie 8: 111-122
 Christiaens, J. (1982). Supplementary notes on Hong Kong Limpets. In: Morton B, editor. Proceedings of the first international marine biological workshop: The marine flora and fauna of Hong Kong and southern China.Hong Kong University Press, Hong Kong. 1: 459-468
 Liu, J.Y. [Ruiyu] (ed.). (2008). Checklist of marine biota of China seas. China Science Press. 1267 pp.

External links
 To Biodiversity Heritage Library (5 publications)
 To World Register of Marine Species

Fissurellidae
Gastropods described in 1860